Zainab College, Cherkkala is a B.Ed. college of Chengala village in Kasaragod District, India.

History
The college was established in 2005 and is affiliated with the Kannur University.

Courses offered
The college offers B.Ed. courses in Commerce, Social science, Natural science, English and Physical science.

References

Colleges of education in India
Colleges affiliated to Kannur University
Colleges in Kasaragod district
Educational institutions established in 2005
2005 establishments in Kerala